Analuyza Oliveira França (born 14 April 2004), simply known as Analuyza, is a Brazilian footballer who plays as a forward for Internacional.

Club career
Analuyza was born in Cristalina, Goiás, and joined Santos' youth setup in 2018, from local side .

Analuyza scored her first senior goal on 27 September 2020, netting the opener in a 6–0 home routing of Ponte Preta. The following 22 January, she signed her first professional contract with the club.

On 28 December 2022, Analuyza left the club after her contract was due to expire. The following 4 January, she joined Internacional.

Honours

Club
Santos
: 2020

International
Brazil U20
South American Under-20 Women's Football Championship: 2022

References

2004 births
Living people
Sportspeople from Goiás
Brazilian women's footballers
Women's association football forwards
Campeonato Brasileiro de Futebol Feminino Série A1 players
Santos FC (women) players
Sport Club Internacional (women) players